Clincher may refer to:

 Clincher tire, a type of bicycle tire
 "The Clincher", a 2005 single by Chevelle
Clincher (band), an Australian band

See also
Clinch (disambiguation)